"(I Wanna Give You) Devotion" is a song by English electronic group Nomad, released in 1991 as the second single from their only album, Changing Cabins (1991). It was a number-one hit in Greece and a top 5 hit in the UK, where it reached number two. In the US, it peaked at number-one on the Billboard Hot Dance Club Play chart in June 1991 and stayed there for one week. MTV Dance ranked the song number 32 in their list of "The 100 Biggest 90s Dance Anthems of All Time" in November 2011.

Background and release
The track was produced by Damon Rochefort, who also shares writing credits with fellow Nomad member Steve McCutcheon and rapper MC Mikee Freedom. It also quotes from the earlier club hit "Devotion" by Ten City. Although Freedom and singer Sharon Dee Clarke were the featured artists on this track when it was released in the United Kingdom and other territories (even though Freedom was the only one to get his name credited), they were listed as uncredited in the US single version up until the act's full-length CD, Changing Cabins, was released Stateside in the autumn of 1991. 

The song is notable for being the first song that Steve Mac ever wrote. When asked about the track and its success in an April 2010 interview, Mac said:

In addition to the rap version, there is also a Soul Mix version that features Clarke's vocal performance without the rap. Both versions along with the Italo house version are included on the Changing Cabins CD.

Critical reception
AllMusic editor Stewart Mason described the song as a "terrific dance club staple" and noted further that singer Sharon Dee Clarke has a "soulful, expressive voice", and writer/programmer Damon Rochefort gives the whole thing a "perky, bouncy feel". David Taylor-Wilson from Bay Area Reporter felt it is "extremely enticing", complimenting Clarke's vocals as "superb". A reviewer from Billboard stated that the song recently topped dance charts "thanks to Sharon Dee Clark's belting vocals and Damon Rochefort's savvy beat and melody construction." An editor, Larry Flick, complimented its "contagious melody, a slammin' groove, and a well-timed trade-off between rapid male rapping and diva-styled femme singing." James Hamilton from Music Weeks RM Dance Update deemed it a "catchily honking political lurcher". In an retrospective review, Pop Rescue remarked that "its audience cheers as Sharon declares that she wants 'to give you devotion' before that familiar bassy synth follows and she lets out that unmistakeable 'heeee-eee-hooo-oooo' piece. Rapper MC Mikee Freedom joins in, in what is a great example of early 1990s chart rap – somewhat slower and devoid of the sexual violence that you'd expect in most rap now." Johnny Dee from Smash Hits declared the track as "utterlly brill". Bob Mack from Spin viewed it as a "great" dance cut and almost a "real song".

Chart performance
"(I Wanna Give You) Devotion" went on becoming a major hit on the charts in Europe, peaking at number-one in Greece. In the UK, it reached number two in its seventh week at the UK Singles Chart, on February 17, 1991. It was held off the top spot by The Simpsons' "Do the Bartman". But on the UK Dance Singles Chart, it hit number one. The song peaked within the top 10 also in Austria, Ireland, Luxembourg (number two), the Netherlands, Spain (number five) and Switzerland, as well as on the Eurochart Hot 100, where it hit number six. Outside Europe, it peaked at number-one on the Billboard Hot Dance Club Play chart in the US, number three on the RPM Dance/Urban chart in Canada and number 37 in Australia. It earned a silver record in the UK, with a sale of 200,000 singles.

Music video
The accompanying music video for "(I Wanna Give You) Devotion" was directed by Jerome Redfarn. It features both MC Mikee Freedom and Sharon Dee Clarke, and have them dressed in body paint while they are performing the song at a rave concert. The video received heavy rotation on MTV Europe.

Impact and legacy
MTV Dance ranked "(I Wanna Give You) Devotion" number 32 in their list of "The 100 Biggest 90s Dance Anthems of All Time" in November 2011. PopMatters included it in their list of "15 Landmark Dance Tracks of 1991" in 2020.

Track listings
 12" CD (UK)  "(I Wanna Give You) Devotion" – 6:42
  "(I Wanna Give You) Devotion" (Instrumental Mix) – 6:42
  "Sang - Froid" – 3:32

 12" maxi CD (UK/US)'
  "(I Wanna Give You) Devotion" (7" Mix) – 4:09
  "(I Wanna Give You) Devotion" (Original Mix) – 6:46
  "(I Wanna Give You) Devotion" (Instrumental) – 6:37
  "(I Wanna Give You) Devotion" (Soul Mix) – 5:00
  "(I Wanna Give You) Devotion" (The Joey Negro Mix) – 6:48
  "(I Wanna Give You) Devotion" (Rock Shock Mix) – 6:39
  "(I Wanna Give You) Devotion" (Trouble's Club Mix) – 6:41
  "(I Wanna Give You) Devotion" (Trouble's Underground Club Mix) – 6:37

Charts and certifications

Weekly charts

Year-end charts

Certifications

References

External links
Track listing at e.discogs.com

1990 songs
1991 singles
1995 singles
Capitol Records singles
EMI Records singles
Hip house songs
British house music songs
Music Week number-one dance singles
Number-one singles in Greece
Songs written by Steve Mac